The 1974 Family Circle Cup was a women's tennis tournament played on outdoor clay courts at the Sea Pines Racquet Club on Hilton Head Island, South Carolina in the United States. The event was part of the 1974 WTA Tour. It was the second edition of the tournament and was held from April 30 through May 5, 1974. First-seeded Chris Evert won the singles title and earned $30,000 first-prize money.

Finals

Singles
 Chris Evert defeated  Kerry Melville 6–1, 6–3
 It was Evert's 6th title of the year and the 29th of her career.

Doubles
 Rosemary Casals /  Olga Morozova defeated  Helen Gourlay /  Karen Krantzcke 6–2, 6–1

References

External links
 Women's Tennis Association (WTA) tournament details

Family Circle Cup
1974 in sports in South Carolina
Charleston Open
Family Circle Cup
Family Circle Cup
Family Circle Cup